Madrid is a ghost town in Las Animas County, Colorado, United States. Madrid is named for Hilario Madrid, who settled there in the 19th century from New Mexico, not after Spain's capital. Originally called Madrid Plaza, it was established as a settler's post in 1864. Hilario and his brother Juan Madrid homesteaded there in September 1879. There was a Post Office in the town from 1882 to 1917.

References

Ghost towns in Colorado
Former populated places in Las Animas County, Colorado